Dennis Burgess (February 18, 1926 – November 3, 1980) was a British television actor born in Neath, Glamorgan, Wales. He married Glenys Maria Hare at Neath, in 1958.

Burgess came from Port Talbot, attended Port Talbot Secondary School and worked as a drama teacher for most of his adult life. He dedicated a lot of his time to helping his father care for his invalid mother, and it wasn't until after she had died that Burgess became a professional actor at 47 years of age, moving from Wales to the south east of England. His first professional role was in a film starring his boyhood friend Richard Burton, who had helped him into the profession. Burton and Burgess had remained great friends, and  a series of letters written by  the screen legend to his old friend, have previously been exhibited at the National Library of Wales at Aberystwyth. They included an invitation to Burton's 50th birthday party in 1975, from his then wife Elizabeth Taylor.

Burgess went on to feature in The Professionals, The Sandbaggers, and The Elephant Man, and played the recurring role of Flambeau in Father Brown.

His second career was to be a short one. On the evening of 3 November 1980, Dennis Burgess was driving to his home in Chesham when he suffered a massive heart attack and veered off the road. He was found dead at the wheel of his car, in the middle of a cricket pitch, in Hemel Hempstead, Hertfordshire, England. He was 54.

Filmography

References

External links
 

British male film actors
British male television actors
1980 deaths
20th-century British male actors
1926 births